William Kinkade can refer to:

Thomas Kinkade (1958–2012), American painter and businessman
Bill Kinkade (born 1957), Mississippi politician